Events from the year 1977 in Sweden

Incumbents
 Monarch – Carl XVI Gustaf 
 Prime Minister – Thorbjörn Fälldin

Events

 15 January – Linjeflyg Flight 618 plane crash.
 3–8 May; The 1st IBF World Championships (badminton) are held in Malmö.
 12 December – ABBA: The Album released.

Births

 7 May – Niklas Modig, researcher.
 14 July – Victoria, Crown Princess of Sweden.
 22 November – Jonas Öberg, open source software activist.
 14 October – Carl Johan Grimmark, guitarist
 18 December – Eddie Jarlsberg, swedish mafia gang leader.

Deaths
 5 March – Albert Andersson, athlete and gymnast (born 1902).
 10 October – Bengt Bengtsson, gymnast (born 1897).

References

 
Sweden
Years of the 20th century in Sweden